Kerry Bevin was leader of The Republic of New Zealand Party, and was a list candidate for the 2005 and 2008 general elections.

The party received the lowest number of votes for any party in both the 2005 and 2008 general elections.

Bevin is a fathers' rights and Men's movement campaigner.

References

External links
Kerry Bevin profile at party website (archived)

Leaders of political parties in New Zealand
New Zealand republicans
Living people
Unsuccessful candidates in the 2005 New Zealand general election
Unsuccessful candidates in the 2008 New Zealand general election
Year of birth missing (living people)